This is a list of co-princes of Andorra.  For further information on the origin and development of the unique Andorran monarchial system, together with details concerning the powers and prerogatives of the Andorran co-princes, see the article Co-Princes of Andorra.

List of co-princes of Andorra

Gallery of current co-princes of Andorra

See also
List of representatives of the Co-Princes of Andorra
List of heads of government of Andorra

References

External links
Representació de S.E. El Copríncep Francés
El Copríncep d'Urgell

Co-Princes
 
 
Andorra
Andorra
Religion and politics